High Authority may refer to;
 High Authority of the European Coal and Steel Community, the original executive body of the former European Coal and Steel Community.
 High authority for the struggle against discrimination and for equality, a French anti-discrimination body.